Suğla can refer to:

 Sanjak of Suğla, an Ottoman province on the Aegean coast
 Lake Suğla, a lake in central Anatolia